Matheus dos Santos Pinto (born 5 October 1992) is a Brazilian footballer.

Career statistics

Club

Notes

References

1992 births
Living people
Brazilian footballers
Brazilian expatriate footballers
Association football midfielders
America Football Club (RJ) players
São Cristóvão de Futebol e Regatas players
Esporte Clube Flamengo players
Resende Futebol Clube
Alecrim Futebol Clube players
Platense F.C. players
C.D. Real Sociedad players
Goytacaz Futebol Clube players
Liga Nacional de Fútbol Profesional de Honduras players
Brazilian expatriate sportspeople in Honduras
Expatriate footballers in Honduras
Footballers from Rio de Janeiro (city)